David Scarpa is an American screenwriter. He is best known for writing the screenplays to The Last Castle, the 2008 remake of The Day the Earth Stood Still and All the Money in the World, about the John Paul Getty III kidnapping, which was released in December 2017.

He currently resides in Los Angeles, California.

Early life
He was born in Fort Campbell, Kentucky, and raised in Tennessee and Connecticut before attending New York University's film program.

Career
Scarpa began writing features. In 2005, he began developing a remake of The Day the Earth Stood Still. Scarpa felt everything about the original film was still relevant, but changed the allegory from nuclear war to environmental damage because "the specifics of [how] we now have the capability to destroy ourselves have changed." Scarpa noted the recent events of Hurricane Katrina in 2005 informed his mindset when writing the screenplay. He scrapped Klaatu's speech at the conclusion of the story because "audiences today are [un]willing to tolerate that. People don't want to be preached to about the environment. We tried to avoid having our alien looking out over the garbage in the lake and crying a silent tear [from the 1970s Keep America Beautiful ads]." He served as the co-showrunner for Amazon Prime Video series The Man in the High Castle season 4.

Upcoming projects
After writing All the Money in the World for director Ridley Scott, he will reteam with the director on two more projects: Napoleon, a historical epic centred on Napoleon Bonaparte, and the sequel to Gladiator. He is also writing Cleopatra for Sony Pictures Entertainment, with Denis Villeneuve directing. In a 2017 interview with The Hollywood Reporter, Scarpa described the film as being "a two-hour, lean, mean political thriller, full of assassinations, etc.", and that it will be "going the opposite direction from the way we think that movie is going to go." Scarpa is also writing the HBO miniseries Londongrad, starring Benedict Cumberbatch as Alexander Litvinenko, who died of polonium-210 poisoning in November 2006.

Filmography

References

External links
 

Living people
Year of birth missing (living people)
21st-century American male writers
People from Kentucky
American male screenwriters
American television producers
American television writers
New York University alumni
Screenwriters from Kentucky